Tuula Anneli Väätäinen (née Häkkinen; born October 2, 1955 in Maaninka) is a Finnish politician. She has been elected as a member of parliament for the Social Democratic Party of Finland in the 2003, 2007, 2011 and 2019 elections. She currently lives in Siilinjärvi and has been involved with its municipal council since 1992. She initially trained as a nurse and studied family therapy at the University of Kuopio, after which she worked as a family therapist.

References

External links
Official website 

1955 births
Living people
People from Maaninka
Social Democratic Party of Finland politicians
Members of the Parliament of Finland (2003–07)
Members of the Parliament of Finland (2007–11)
Members of the Parliament of Finland (2011–15)
Members of the Parliament of Finland (2019–23)